Teolo is a comune (municipality) in the Province of Padua in the Italian region Veneto, located about  west of Venice and about  southwest of Padua.

The municipality of Teolo is divided into the frazioni of Bresseo, Castelnuovo, Feriole, Praglia, San Biagio, Tramonte, Treponti (which houses the municipal seat) and Villa .

References

External links
 Official website

Cities and towns in Veneto
Spa towns in Italy